Nicholas Strincevich (March 1, 1915 – November 11, 2011) was an American Major League baseball player. Born in Gary, Indiana, the right-handed pitcher made his big-league debut with the Boston Bees on April 23, 1940, played part of the 1941 season with the Boston Braves, played from 1941 to 1948 (excluding 1943) with the Pittsburgh Pirates, and finished his big league career on June 11, 1948, with the Philadelphia Phillies. According to at least one source, Strincevich was selected to play on the 1945 All-Star team from the National League, but, due to wartime travel restrictions, the game was never played.
 
In a 10-season career, Strincevich posted a 46–49 record with a 4.05 ERA in 889 innings pitched.

Strincevich died on November 11, 2011 in Valparaiso, Indiana. His funeral service was held at the Saint Sava Serbian Orthodox Church of Merrillville, Indiana. He was buried at Calumet Park Cemetery.

References

External links

Listing from Baseball Almanac
Listing from Baseball Library

1915 births
2011 deaths
Akron Yankees players
American people of Serbian descent
Baseball players from Gary, Indiana
Boston Bees players
Boston Braves players
Butler Yankees players
Major League Baseball pitchers
Milwaukee Brewers (minor league) players
Newark Bears (IL) players
Norfolk Tars players
Philadelphia Phillies players
Pittsburgh Pirates players
Sacramento Solons players
Toronto Maple Leafs (International League) players